Hans-Jürgen Sasse (April 30, 1943 in Berlin – January 14, 2015) was a German linguist.

Life 
Sasse studied linguistics, Indo-European, Semitics and Balkanology in Berlin, Thessaloniki and Munich. He was awarded a Ph.D. in 1970 in Munich by the Department of Semitic Languages for his dissertation Linguistische Analyse des arabischen Dialekts der Mhallamiye in der Provinz Mardin (Südosttürkei). From 1972 to 1977 he was Research Assistant at the Institut für Allgemeine und Indogermanische Sprachwissenschaft (Institute for General and Indo-European Linguistics) in Munich. In 1975, he received his habilitation with the book Die Morphophonologie des Galab-Verbs and in 1977 he was made a Professor. In 1987, he became Chair of General and Comparative Linguistics at the University of Cologne. Sasse retired in the Winter Semester 2008/2009.

Sasse was cofounder of the "Documentation of Endangered Languages" (DOBES) initiative of the Volkswagen Foundation. In 2001, he was elected a full member of the North Rhine Westphalia Academy of Sciences, Humanities, and the Arts. His obituary cites him as a "pioneer of modern language documentation, [and] master in language documentation and linguistic theory".

Achievements 
Sasse was concerned with grammatical relations and lexical categories, language universals, discourse, and grammar, historical linguistics and reconstruction. He also conducted research on language contact and language death, as well as the lexicon. Among the languages and language families on which he conducted research were languages of the Balkans (especially Modern Greek and Albanian), Afro-asiatic languages (especially Semitic languages and Cushitic languages - particularly the Burji language), and Native American languages (especially Iroquoian languages). His work was based on numerous fieldwork studies.

References 

Academic staff of the University of Cologne
Linguists of Indo-European languages
Academic staff of the Ludwig Maximilian University of Munich
Linguists from Germany
1943 births
2015 deaths
People from Berlin